Michael Scott Lachowski was the bass guitar player for Pylon, a band from Athens, Georgia. He was born in Norfolk, Virginia and attended the University of Georgia art school. He and his roommate Randy Bewley formed Pylon, recruiting Curtis Crowe as a drummer, and Vanessa Briscoe Hay, a fellow student at the University of Georgia. They recorded the single "Cool/Dub", an album Gyrate, an EP, another album Chomp, and two singles. Pylon toured the United States, Canada and the United Kingdom before breaking up in 1983. They returned to tour again in 1988, and recorded another album, Chain, in 1990, before breaking up again in 1991. Pylon reformed in 2005 and occasionally performed until 2009, when Bewley died.
Their first album, Gyrate Plus, was reissued on October 16, 2007, by DFA Records, New York City. In 2009, Chomp More was also reissued by DFA Records.

Lachowski has had a graphic design firm in Athens called Candy and a magazine called Young, Foxy and Free. He also works on occasion as a disc jockey and has been involved as a participant in the Bicycle Ride Across Georgia for years. He has worked in public relations at the Georgia Museum of Art since 2012.

Discography
Pylon
 Cool/Dub 7" single (Caution Records 1979)
 Gyrate LP (DB Records, Armageddon 1980)
 Pylon !! EP (DB Records, Armageddon 1980)
 Crazy/M-Train 7" single (DB Records 1981)
 Beep/Altitude 7" single (DB Records 1982)
 Four Minutes/Beep/Altitude  EP (Db recs 1982)
 Chomp LP (DB Records 1983)
 Hits CD/cassette (DB Records 1988)
 Chain LP/CD (Sky Records 1990)
 Gyrate Plus CD (DFA Records 2007)
 Chomp More CD (DFA Records 2009)
 Gravity/Weather Radio  7" single (Chunklet 2016)
 Pylon Live Double LP  (Chunklet 2016)

Other
 Dead Letter Office (LP) LP (IRS Records 1985) (Cover of "Crazy" by R.E.M.)
 Cover + Remix 7" single (DFA Records, October 2011) (Cover of "Cool" by Deerhunter, Remix of Yo-Yo by Calvinist)

Filmography 
 Athens, GA.: Inside/Out (1987), archive footage, interview

Video 
 Beep (1990), Pylon, from CD: Hits, a compilation, DB Records
 Look Alive (1992), Pylon, from album :Chain, Sky Records

References

Reynolds, Simon: Rip It Up and Start Again: Postpunk 1978-1984, Penguin Books, February 2006, p. 264.
Strong,Martin Charles: The Great Indie Discography, Canongate Books, October 2003, p. 282.
Christgau,Robert: Christgau's Consumer Guide-the 80's, Pantheon Books, 1990, pp. 329, 498, 506.

External links
 Pylon official web site
 PARTY ZONE: a tribute to Pylon
 Pylon unofficial web site
 AllMusic entry on Pylon
 Young, Foxy and Free online magazine
  Michael Lachowski art online

University of Georgia alumni
Guitarists from Georgia (U.S. state)
American bass guitarists
Living people
American DJs
American graphic designers
American new wave musicians
Year of birth missing (living people)
Pylon (band) members